Santosh Gajanan Honavar is an Indian ophthalmologist and is currently the editor of the Indian Journal of Ophthalmology and Indian Journal of Ophthalmology - Case Reports, the official journals of the All India Ophthalmological Society;  Director, Medical Services (Centre for Sight Group); Director, Department of Ocular Oncology and Oculoplasty at Centre for Sight, Hyderabad; and Director, National Retinoblastoma Foundation.

A former head of the Department of Ophthalmic Plastic Surgery and Ocular Oncology and associate director at L. V. Prasad Eye Institute, he is known for his research on retinoblastoma. He is counted among the top 2% of world researchers and among the top 10 Indian ophthalmologists in research.

The Council of Scientific and Industrial Research, the apex agency of the Government of India for scientific research, awarded him the Shanti Swarup Bhatnagar Prize for Science and Technology, one of the highest Indian science awards, for his contributions to Medical Sciences in 2009.. Dr Honavar is the only Indian Ophthalmologist to receive the Lifetime Achievement Award by the American Academy of Ophthalmology and the Honorary Fellowship of the Royal College of Ophthalmologists, London, UK.

Biography 

Santosh Honavar, born in Pune in the Indian state Maharashtra to Bhavani Ganapi Melinkeri and Gajanan Narayan Honavar, graduated in medicine from Bangalore Medical College and Research Institute and did his post-graduate training and Senior Residency in Ophthalmic Plastic Surgery, Glaucoma and Pediatric Ophthalmology at Dr. Rajendra Prasad Center for Ophthalmic Sciences of the All India Institute of Medical Sciences, Delhi. Subsequently, he moved to the US to undergo advanced training at Wills Eye Hospital of Thomas Jefferson University where he had the opportunity to train under Jerry A. Shields, Carol Shields and Arun Singh. On his return to India, he continued to work with L. V. Prasad Eye Institute (LVPEI) where he strengthened the Department of Ophthalmic Plastic Surgery and founded Ocular Oncology Service, the first facility for ocular oncology in India. He rose to become the associate director of LVPEI and last held the position of the director of Patient Care Policies and Planning at LVPEI. Subsequently, he moved to Centre for Sight, Hyderabad (CFS) and heads the Department of Ocular Oncology and Ophthalmic Plastic Surgery. He is also the director of National Retinoblastoma Foundation since 2013 and CFS Education, the educational and training division of Centre for Sight. He has been working in close association with the renowned oncologist Vijay Anand Reddy for over 20 years now, managing the entire spectrum of tumors of the eye and adnexa. In addition to his clinical responsibilities, Dr Honavar is currently the editor of Indian Journal of Ophthalmology, and Indian Journal of Ophthalmology Case Reports.

Legacy 

Ocular oncology, especially retinoblastoma, has been the principal research area of Honavar and he is known to have contributed to the understanding and treatment of various tumors affecting the ocular surface and orbit. Working on retinoblastoma, he developed various therapeutic and management protocols which included high-dose and periocular chemotherapy, adjuvant therapy to mitigate the high risk of metastasis and multimodal management of orbital affection of the disease and he is reported to have treated over 2000 pediatric retinoblastoma patients with a success rate above of 85%. At L. V. Prasad Eye Institute, he was the first to perform intra-ocular brachytherapy procedure, along with Vijay Anand Reddy. His studies have been documented by way of a number of articles of which many have been listed by online article repositories such as Google Scholar and ResearchGate. Besides, he has contributed chapters to books published by others. He is a section editor for Asia Pacific Academy of Ophthalmology and is a member of the advisory committee of International Council of Ophthalmology. He serves as the scientific program coordinator of Oculoplastic Association of India and has also mentored research scholars in their studies. The invited speeches delivered by him include the BOPSS 2016 of the British Oculoplastic Surgery Society.

Awards and honors 

 Honavar, who held the ARVO-Santen International Fellowship in 1996 and Zeigler International Fellowship of Orbis International in 1999, is a recipient of the Pfizer National Award (1990) and the Col. Rangachari Gold Medal (1992) of the All India Ophthalmological Society. 
 The Indian Society of Oncology awarded him the Young Scientist Award in 2000 and he received two awards from the Andhra Pradesh State Ophthalmological Society in 2001 viz. Dr. Vengala Rao Award and Career Achievement Award. 
 He has received five honors from American Academy of Ophthalmology, the Best of Show Award in 2002, 2006 and 2010, Achievement Award in 2002, and the Senior Achievement Award in 2009. In between, he received the Dr. Siva Reddy International Award of All India Ophthalmological Society in 2007. 
 The Council of Scientific and Industrial Research awarded the Shanti Swarup Bhatnagar Prize, one of the highest Indian science awards in 2009. 
 He also delivered the Dr. Surya Prasad Rao Award Oration of the Andhra Pradesh State Ophthalmological Association in 2006.

 MA Matin Award, Bangladesh Academy of Ophthalmology, 2013
 Jerry Shields International Award, APAO, 2013
 Distinguished Service Award, APAO, 2019
 Peter Rogers Oration, RANZCO, 2019
 In December, 2019, he was awarded the Life Achievement Honor Award by the American Academy of Ophthalmology, he's the first Indian to receive the award.
 Dr Honavar is the only Indian to be bestowed upon the Honorary Fellowship of the Royal College of Ophthalmologists, UK, 2020.

See also 

 Retinoblastoma protein
 Coats' disease
 Trilateral retinoblastoma
 Pinealoblastoma

Notes

References

Publications

External links 
 
 

1965 births
Scientists from Pune
Indian ophthalmologists
Indian oncologists
Medical doctors from Maharashtra
Indian medical writers
All India Institute of Medical Sciences, New Delhi alumni
Thomas Jefferson University alumni
Recipients of the Shanti Swarup Bhatnagar Award in Medical Science
Living people